Kadannappalli Ramachandran (born 1 July 1944) is an Indian politician and President of Congress (S), and the current MLA of Congress (S) representing the Kannur constituency in Kannur, Kerala.

Career
Ramachandran was the Minister for Devaswom, Printing and Stationery (17th August 2009 to 14 May 2011) and Minister for Ports, Museums and Archaeology (25 May 2016 to 3 May 2021) in the Government of Kerala. He became MLA in 1980, 2006, 2016, 2021. He represented the Irikkur constituency, Edakkad constituency and Kannur constituency in Kannur district in the Kerala Legislative Assembly. He started his political career as I.S.U. Unit President in school life. He  was the President of  K.S.U. Cannanore Taluk Committee and General Secretary of K.S.U. State Committee. He became Kannur District Convenor of Youth Congress. He was the  State Vice President, K.S.U. (1969–71). Ramachandran contested and won the Indian General Elections in 1971 as INC candidate from Kasaragod Lokasabha Constituency, his first opponent was the veteran leader Shri. E.K. Nayanar. At that time he was a student in Law Academy. He was re-elected from the same constituency in 1977 also. He became  Member of Public Accounts Committee of Lok Sabha and Consultative Committee of Ministry of Railways and Communication, Kannur Assembly constituency in 1980. He became General Secretary of  Congress(S) State Committee in 1989 and  State President of Congress(S) since 1990.

Personal life

Son of Shri P.V. Krishnan Gurukkal and Smt. T. K. Parvathi Amma. Ramachandran is married to T.R. Saraswathi, a teacher. They have a son, Mithun Puthanveettil, a musician in the band Avial. He has got a unique style of dressing.

See also 

 Kerala Council of Ministers

References

External links

Malayali politicians
People from Kannur district
1944 births
Living people
India MPs 1977–1979
India MPs 1971–1977
Lok Sabha members from Kerala
Kerala MLAs 2016–2021
Kerala MLAs 2006–2011
Indian Congress (Socialist) politicians
Indian National Congress (U) politicians